On January 21, 2023, American singer Beyoncé gave a private performance on the Palm Jumeirah in Dubai to commemorate the unveiling of luxury hotel resort Atlantis The Royal, in her first concert since 2018. Beyoncé was reportedly paid over $24 million for the private performance, making it the highest-paid in history, according to Forbes.

The ballad-heavy show was part of a three-day launch event for the hotel in which journalists, celebrities, and influencers were invited.

Despite having a no-phone policy and taking security measures to have the performance unrecorded, many attendees filmed the concert anyway and leaked the videos online. Beyoncé's production company then released limited official photos and footage of the concert to the public.

Background 

Beyoncé previously performed in Dubai in 2005 as part of Destiny's Child for the Destiny Fulfilled... and Lovin' It world tour. They performed at the Dubai Media City Amphitheatre. She then performed in the United Arab Emirates again as a solo act in 2009 during a stop on the I Am... world tour. She performed at the Yas Marina Circuit, to open the 2009 Abu Dhabi Grand Prix in Abu Dhabi.

On December 23, 2022, British tabloid newspaper The Sun broke the story that Beyoncé would give an hour-long performance for Atlantis The Royal on January 21 for more than $20 million. The concert was noted as Beyoncé's first since releasing her seventh studio album Renaissance just six months beforehand. According to Forbes, Beyoncé was reportedly paid $24 million to perform for Atlantis The Royal, making the concert the highest-paid private performance in history.

Various publications were sent invites to a weekend in Dubai with courtesy expense and transport and promised an unspecified "once-in-a-lifetime" performance. Beyoncé reportedly underwent foot surgery before the performance.

On January 18, three days before the concert, fans reported hearing soundchecks for several of Beyoncé's songs outside the hotel. Security lined up around the area in preparation for the event.

Performance 
On January 21, Beyoncé gave the private performance in front of Atlantis The Royal hotel. It was ballad-heavy and her first concert since 2018. There was a fireworks display and drone show. Beyoncé performed seventeen tracks from her own discography while interpolating and incorporating elements of other songs. Companioning Firdaus Orchestra performed renditions of songs by regional musicians, including Algerian singer Warda's "Batwanes Beek", and Lebanese singer Fairuz's "Li Beirut". Beyoncé performed "Brown Skin Girl" with her daughter Blue Ivy.

The show incorporated Renaissance-era and Middle Eastern instruments like the oud (stringed lute), buzuq (a long-necked, fretted lute), riq (tambourine) and darbuka (goblet drum). Beyoncé was accompanied by musical ensemble 1500 or Nothin', and Firdaus Orchestra, a 24-nationality, Dubai-based all-woman orchestra.

Beyoncé was backed by Lebanese all-female dance group The Mayyas. She was raised 16 feet into the air.

Swedish House Mafia performed following Beyoncé at the opening's afterparty.

Fashion and stage design 
Beyoncé aimed to highlight emerging regional talent instead of those established. She did three costume changes, and was styled by frequent stylist collaborator KJ Moody. Two chosen up-and-coming designers included Mousa Al Awfi and Rayan Al Sulaimani through the Dubai-based mother-daughter owned label Atelier Zuhra, and Chris Habana for a Nicolas Jebran piece. Al Awfi tailored a yellow gown with a high feathered skirt, Manolo Blahnik shoes, a structured bare corset and a Marabou train resembling wings. Jebran tailored a full cape skirt linked to a red corset with gold stone embellishments, to which Beyoncé wore Lorraine Schwartz earrings and a Habana-styled Swarovski-crystal embellished "halo" headpiece. Beyoncé closed the show dressed in Malone Souliers shoes and in a custom pink "firework-inspired" corset dress by Ukrainian designer Ivan Frolov, who created it in the brand's Kyiv workshop against a "backdrop of catastrophic circumstances," to pay homage to the people of Ukraine.

Beyoncé's daughter Blue Ivy was dressed in a red sequin jumpsuit designed by her grandmother Tina Knowles and Timothy White. In coordination with Beyoncé's wardrobe team and the event's general theme, the Firdaus Orchestra wore red sequined gowns and jumpers, designed by Arshia Alam of Emirati brand Arshys, who has worked with the orchestra since their debut performance. Beyoncé wore $7.5 million worth of Lorraine Schwartz jewels, a 30-carat yellow diamond ring and green Colombian emerald and diamond fan earrings that reportedly weighed more than 100-carats.

The stage backdrop was inspired by Ancient Greece as a reimagined version of Raphael's "The School of Athens" painting, with Black phenotypical features and hair textures of white stone sculptures, instead of those originally painted of white people. The Firdaus Orchestra studio staff and Adi Modi created the stage monitors for the orchestra and concert.

Audience 

The performance was invite-only and the concert had a no-phone policy. Attendees were asked to put their phones or any other recording devices in locked pouches to stop them from filming the performance. Despite this and other security measures, many videos of the concert quickly surfaced online. Some non-invitees livestreamed the concert online as it happened from across the waterbody surrounding Atlantis The Royal. American singer Lizzo watched one of these, tweeting "I have seen Beyoncé perform live 10 times in my lifetime... and today the 11th time was on [an Instagram] live across a body of water of a hotel." Beyoncé's production company Parkwood Entertainment then made a small number of official concert images and clips available to the public.

Launch event 
Atlantis The Royal was originally set to open in October 2022 but was rescheduled for 2023. The resort became open to the public and available for reservation on February 10, 2023, and the launch event lasted three days. Journalists, celebrities, and influencers were invited, given accommodation at the hotel and given first class airfare on Emirates.

January 22 
Beyoncé hosted a fashion show to showcase an Ivy Park collection titled "Park Trail". Models displayed items at Nobu by the Beach (one of the eight restaurants at the resort). Some items of clothing worn from the collection included jackets, coats, blazers, hoodies, sweatsuits and jersey dresses. The pieces were "inspired by the resilience of the outdoors, the spirit of the streets, and the possibilities of the future". Beyoncé did not attend but instead her music was DJed by her creative director Andrew Makadsi. Songs included "Break My Soul," "Cuff It," "Cozy" and "Heated", all from Renaissance. Also played was Janet Jackson’s "What Have You Done for Me Lately" and Madonna’s "Vogue".

Public response 
Leaked clips from the performance went viral on social media. Beyoncé's new vocal arrangements for "Drunk in Love" sparked vocal challenges online, especially on TikTok, in which fans attempted to recreate them. Some of the hashtags included #DrunkInLoveChallenge and #BeyonceInDubai.

Controversies 
Some journalists called into question the ethical implications of invited journalists' expenses being covered by Beyoncé. Kristal Brent Zook said that this was unethical because it defied the code of ethics set out by the Society of Professional Journalists. Yanick Rice Lamb, professor at Howard University, said that journalists should have denied the invitation, as they would be more inclined to cover the event positively because of the "once-in-a-lifetime experience" being offered to them.

Beyoncé was criticised for performing in Dubai due to the United Arab Emirates' (UAE) criminalization of homosexuality. According to the BBC, Beyoncé's most recent album Renaissance celebrated and honoured black queer culture and paid tribute to "dance music that emerged out of the gay community." In an interview with BBC Newsbeat, music journalist Abigail Firth said that Renaissance was "indebted to LGBT culture" and the performance "seem[ed] like a really misguided choice." Human rights advocate Radha Stirling said that the concert sent people a "mixed message" of the United Arab Emirates as a "tolerant country" and "whitewash[ed]" the reality of its laws. She said "fans who follow their favorite singer to Dubai could face extreme human rights violations if accused of infringements of the UAE's strict homosexuality, offensive behavior and alcohol consumption laws." The controversy sparked a larger conversation as to whether or not popstars should perform in countries where homosexuality is illegal.

Some Emiratis in the LGBTQ community did not share negative sentiments. A queer Emirati woman spoke to Newsweek detailing surprise from her native circle, saying "the outrage comes from an international audience with little knowledge of the UAE and the type of events that periodically take place here." She referenced musicians who are LGBTQ or LGBTQ allies who have performed in the region before, such as Lady Gaga, Elton John, Adam Lambert and Boy George. The Guardian referenced the London School of Economics' research into western gay men and their ability to evade punishment in the UAE, by "us[ing] their economic, social and cultural privileges to create communities where they can meet and socialise." Newsweek also featured a gay Emirati man who communicated that he viewed the real issue was the private nature of the performance, and expressed frustration at western notions of the Emiratis' experience in the UAE as a "super harsh" experience. In an interview with TMZ, Beyoncé's father Mathew Knowles defended the performance, saying that the concert "united a diverse audience", and that she gave and received respect to the UAE. He described the criticism as "narrow-minded" and referenced Beyoncé's history of support for the LGBTQ community, how she "would never deliberately hurt someone" and always stood for inclusiveness.

Set list 
The following songs were performed at the concert.

"At Last"
 "XO"
 "Flaws And All" 
 "Ave Maria"
 "Halo"
 "Brown Skin Girl"  
 "Be Alive"
 "Spirit of Rangeela" 
 "Otherside"
 "Bigger"
 "Spirit"
 "Freedom"
 "I Care"
 "Beautiful Liar"
 "Bwatwains Beek" 
 "Crazy in Love" 
 "Countdown"
 "Naughty Girl"  
 "Drunk in Love"

Notes
 The set list was leaked by Brazilian magazine POPline a few hours before the performance.
 Beyoncé did not perform any songs from Renaissance, the studio album she released six months prior.
 This was the first time Beyoncé had performed the songs "Brown Skin Girl", "Otherside", "Bigger" and "Spirit".

References 

Beyoncé concerts